Barner Stücker See is a lake in Nordwestmecklenburg, Mecklenburg-Vorpommern, Germany.

Lakes of Mecklenburg-Western Pomerania
LBarner